The Principle of normality in solid mechanics states that if a normal to the yield locus is constructed at the point of yielding, the strains that result from yielding are in the same ratio as the stress components of the normal.

References

Solid mechanics